Jock O'Brien may refer to:

 Jock O'Brien (footballer, born 1909) (1909–1985), Australian rules footballer for Essendon
 Jock O'Brien (footballer, born 1937), Australian rules footballer for North Melbourne

See also
John O'Brien (disambiguation)